There is an Ocean is a film documenting the Scottish songwriter Donovan during his time spent in Greece with his band Open Road in 1970. The film remained unreleased until 2005 when it was included in the box set Try for the Sun: The Journey of Donovan.

Background

In 1969 Donovan left the United States at the height of his popularity, leaving his longtime producer Mickie Most, and returned home to explore new directions in his music. With drummer "Candy" John Carr and bassist/guitarist Mike Thompson, he formed a band called Open Road, who released an eponymous album in 1970. Donovan's plan was to tour the world with the band for one year, primarily by boat, as a "tax exile" from the UK. In order to avoid Britain's exorbitant taxes, he needed to be gone from the 5th of April one year to the 5th of April the next, so at the onset of spring, Donovan flew to Greece where he met up with friends, family, bandmates, and his yacht, christened Vagrant.

The band stayed on the island of Crete where they rehearsed for upcoming dates in France, Italy, and Japan, and sailed to various fishing villages on the islands of Sikinos, Ios, and Ithaca to play pop-up gigs for locals and tourists. It is these impromptu concerts, along the beauty of Greece's landscapes and views of the Aegean and Ionian Seas, that There is an Ocean documents.

The film was directed, edited, and produced by British filmmaker Nigel Lesmoir-Godon, who had also made a film about Syd Barrett during the early days of Pink Floyd.

Songs

Although Donovan and Open Road had electric instruments in their rehearsal space on Crete, these sessions do not appear on film. All songs are performed by Mike Thompson and Donovan playing acoustic guitars and John Carr on bongo drums and bells. Sometimes the group use microphones, sometimes not. Donovan also sings "The Pee Song" with his three-year-old son.

At the time of filming, none of the songs featured in There is an Ocean had appeared on any of Donovan's albums, with the exception of "Riki Tiki Tavi". Most other songs would appear on subsequent releases between 1971 and 2010.

Song list
"Sailing Homeward"c
"Two Types of People"
"Sailing Homeward"c (reprise)
"The Pee Song"b (with Donovan Leitch, Jr.)
"Love Seed"e
"The Garden"d
"Electric Moon"f
"It's Got to be Gas"
"Barabajagal Came To Blythe Fair"
"Sailing Homeward"c (re-reprise)
"Your Love is Taking Me Higher"
"Riki Tiki Tavi"a
"When the Big Moon Rise"
"Happy Birthday"/"Ocean"
"Moon Dance" (Grecian bagpipe music)
"The Journey To Ithaca" (poem by Constantine Cavafy)
"There is an Ocean"c

Studio versions

Studio recordings of the songs in the film appear on the following Donovan albums:
a  Open Road (1970)
b HMS Donovan (1971)
c Essence to Essence (1974)
d Sutras (1996)
e Ritual Groove (2010)
f    Lyrics appear in Donovan's autobiography (2007)

Personnel
 Donovan Leitch – narration, guitar, vocals
 Mike Thompson – guitar, vocals
 "Candy" John Carr – percussion, vocals
 David Reid – photography
 Chris O'Dell – photography
 Robbie Laurie – assistant
 Greg Bailey – sound recording
 Nigel Lesmoir-Gordon – director, editing, producer

References

1970 films
1970 in Greece
1970 in music
Films shot in Greece
British documentary films
2000s English-language films
1970s English-language films
1970s British films
2000s British films